"Calm Down" is a song by Australian rock band Killing Heidi, released as the second single from their third studio album, Killing Heidi (2004). Released as a single on 27 September 2004, the song reached number 23 on the Australian Singles Chart and is Killing Heidi's most recent hit. The video was shot in the open spaces of Broken Hill, New South Wales.

Track listing
Australian CD single
 "Calm Down" – 3:32
 "Never Know Me" – 4:39
 "See What's Inside" – 5:25

Charts

References

2004 singles
2004 songs
Columbia Records singles
Killing Heidi songs
Songs written by Ella Hooper
Songs written by Jesse Hooper